The World Short Track Speed Skating Championships are a senior international short track speed skating competition held once a year to determine the World Champion in individual distances, relays and Overall Classification. It is sanctioned by the International Skating Union and is usually held in March or April.

In 1967, the International Skating Union adopted short track speed skating, although it did not organise international competitions until 1976. World Championships have been held since 1981, though earlier events later received that status.

Skaters perform individual races in the 500 meters, 1000 meters, 1500 meters, 3000 meters (super-final involving eight competitors with highest points after completion of other distances) and a four-person race, in the 3000 meters relay for women, and the 5000 meters relay for men. Points are given for each placings in the finals of individual distances (currently 34 points for 1st, 21 for 2nd, 13 for 3rd, 8 for 4th, 5 for 5th, 3 for 6th, 2 for 7th, 1 for 8th). From 2009, the leader after first 1000m in the 3000m super-final is given extra 5 points. The athlete with the highest points after the points for all individual distances are added up (maximum 141 points, 136 points before 2009) is declared the Men's or Ladies' Overall World Short-track Speed Skating Champion. In case of a tie in points, precedence is given to the athlete with higher placing in the 3000m super-final.

The 2020 edition was supposed to be held in Seoul, South Korea, from 13 to 15 March 2020 but had been postponed after authorities ordered the closure of the Mokdong Ice Rink due to the outbreak of the coronavirus. The International Skating Union initially announced they were trying to reschedule the tournament to the beginning of the 2020–21 season but cancelled the event on 16 April 2020.

Summary 
1976-1977: as a world event (World Competition)

1978-1980: as ISU championship

1981-now: as ISU World Championship

 2020 Edition in Seoul was cancelled.

Overall classification medalists

Men

Ladies

All-time medal count
After the 2023 World Short Track Speed Skating Championships.

Hosting tally

Records

Largest number of titles
 Men:  Ahn Hyun Soo /  Viktor An: 6 (2003–2007, 2014)
 Ladies:  Yang Yang (A) : 6 (1997–2002)

Most consecutive titles
 Men:  Ahn Hyun-Soo: 5 (2003–2007)
 Ladies:  Yang Yang (A): 6 (1997–2002)

Gold medal sweeps
 Men: 2002 ( Kim Dong-Sung)
 Men: 1992 ( Kim Ki-Hoon)
 Ladies: 1983 ( Sylvie Daigle) – relay title not awarded despite the win in the race
 Ladies: 2021 ( Suzanne Schulting)

Medal sweeps
 Men: 1982–1983 ( Canada), 1992 ( South Korea)
 Ladies: 1982 ( Canada), 2005 ( South Korea)

Notes

See also
World Short Track Speed Skating Team Championships
World Junior Short Track Speed Skating Championships
World Speed Skating Championships
Short Track Speed Skating World Cup
Short track speed skating

References

External links
World Short Track
International Skating Union

 
Short track speed skating competitions